September is the ninth month of the year.

September may also refer to:

Film 
 September (1984 film), a Chinese film by Tian Zhuangzhuang
 September (1987 film), an American film by Woody Allen
 September (2003 film), a German drama by Max Färberböck
 September (2007 film), an Australian film by Peter Carstairs
 September (2011 film), a Turkish drama by Cemil Ağacıkoğlu
 September (2013 film), a Greek drama by Penny Panayotopoulou
September, a 2018 film from Nathaniel Dorsky's Arboretum Cycle
 September Films, a UK independent television and film production company

Music

Artists
 September (band), Yugoslav jazz rock band
 September (singer), Swedish singer

Albums
September (2004 album), the debut album by September
September (2008 album), the US debut album by September
 The September EP, a 2005 EP by Anorexia Nervosa

Songs and compositions
 "September" (Daughtry song), 2010
 "September" (Deborah Cox song), 2000
 "September" (Earth, Wind & Fire song), 1978
 “September Song”, an American jazz standard composed by Kurt Weill
 "September", an art song by Charles Ives
September Music, a composition by David Matthews
 “September”, a song by Heather Duby from Post to Wire
 “September”, a song by Jean Michel Jarre from Revolutions
 “September”, a song by Ryan Adams from Jacksonville City Nights
 “September”, a song by St. Lucia from When the Night
 "September", a song by Mariya Takeuchi

Other uses 
 September (Roman month), the seventh month of the Roman calendar
 September (Fringe), an Observer from the TV series Fringe
 September (novel), a 1990 novel by Rosamunde Pilcher
 Dulcie September (1935–1988), South African anti-apartheid activist
 Waylain September (born 1984), South African cricketer

See also
 
 Black September (disambiguation)
 Eternal September, a Usenet term
 Sept (disambiguation)